Wabe, pron. [ˈʋaːbə], is an uncommon Frisian masculine given name. It is a reduced form of Germanic names starting with Wald- (meaning "ruler"), which have a second part starting with the letter b, such as Waldbert or Waldbrecht.

References

Frisian masculine given names